EGOT, an acronym for the Emmy, Grammy, Oscar, and Tony Awards, is the designation given to people who have won all four of the major American entertainment awards. Respectively, these awards honor outstanding achievements in television, recording, film, and Broadway theatre. Achieving the EGOT has been referred to as the "grand slam" of show business.  18 people have won a competitive EGOT, while five others have also earned the distinction with honorary or special awards.

The EGOT acronym was coined by actor Philip Michael Thomas in late 1984, when his role on Miami Vice brought him instant fame, and he stated a desire to achieve the EGOT within five years. (Thomas has yet to be nominated for any EGOT prize.) The acronym gained wider recognition following a 2009 episode of 30 Rock that introduced EGOT status as a recurring plotline.

EGOT winners

Notes

Non-competitive EGOT
Five additional artists have received all four awards, though one was bestowed for an honorary or similar non-competitive distinction: Barbra Streisand has no competitive Tony, Liza Minnelli has no competitive Grammy, and Harry Belafonte, James Earl Jones, and Quincy Jones have no competitive Oscar.

The EGOT winners synopsis

Richard Rodgers

American composer Richard Rodgers (1902–1979) received his fourth distinct award in 1962. Between 1946 and 1979, Rodgers received a total of 10 competitive awards. He was the first person to win all four and was primarily a composer.
 Academy Awards:
 1946: Best Song – "It Might as Well Be Spring" from State Fair
 Primetime Emmy Awards:
 1962: Outstanding Achievement in Original Music Composed – Winston Churchill: The Valiant Years
 Grammy Awards:
 1960: Best Show Album (Original Cast) – The Sound of Music
 1962: Best Original Cast Show Album – No Strings
 Tony Awards:
 1950: Best Musical – South Pacific
 1950: Tony Award for Producers, Musical – South Pacific
 1950: Best Score – South Pacific
 1952: Best Musical – The King and I
 1960: Best Musical – The Sound of Music
 1962: Best Composer – No Strings
 Special Awards:
 1962: Special Tony Award "for all he has done for young people in the theatre and for taking the men of the orchestra out of the pit and putting them onstage in No Strings"
 1972: Special Tony Award
 1979: Special Tony Award, Lawrence Langner Memorial Award for Distinguished Lifetime Achievement in the American Theatre

Helen Hayes

American actress Helen Hayes (1900–1993) received her fourth distinct award in 1977. Between 1932 and 1980, Hayes received a total of 6 competitive awards. She was the first woman and the first performer to win all four. Hayes was also the first person to win the Triple Crown of Acting, with singular (non-group/ensemble/company) acting wins in each of the Emmy, Oscar, and Tony awards, winning her third in 1953. Counting only the first award of each type, she also has the distinction of the longest timespan (45 years) between her first and fourth award of any showbiz Grand Slam winner.
 Academy Awards:
 1932: Best Actress in a Leading Role – The Sin of Madelon Claudet
 1971: Best Actress in a Supporting Role – Airport
 Primetime Emmy Awards:
 1953: Best Actress – Schlitz Playhouse of Stars for the episode "Not a Chance"
 Grammy Awards:
 1977: Best Spoken Word Recording – Great American Documents
 Tony Awards:
 1947: Best Actress in a Play – Happy Birthday
 1958: Distinguished Dramatic Actress – Time Remembered
 Special Awards:
 1980: Special Tony Award, Lawrence Langner Memorial Award for Distinguished Lifetime Achievement in the American Theatre

Rita Moreno

Puerto Rican actress, dancer, and singer Rita Moreno (born 1931) received her fourth distinct award in 1977. Between 1961 and 1978, Moreno received a total of five awards. She is also the first Latina winner and the first winner to win a Grammy as their second award (both previous winners won Tonys as their second award). In addition, she became a Kennedy Center Honoree in 2015 and on March 28, 2019, it was announced that she would receive a Peabody Award.
 Academy Awards:
 1962: Best Actress in a Supporting Role – West Side Story
 Primetime Emmy Awards:
 1977: Outstanding Continuing or Single Performance by a Supporting Actress in Variety or Music – The Muppet Show
 1978: Outstanding Lead Actress for a Single Appearance in a Drama or Comedy Series – The Rockford Files 
 Grammy Awards:
 1972: Best Recording for Children – The Electric Company
 Tony Awards:
 1975: Best Featured Actress in a Play – The Ritz

John Gielgud

English actor and theatre director John Gielgud (1904–2000) received his fourth distinct award in 1991. Between 1948 and 1991, Gielgud received a total of 5 competitive awards. Gielgud was the first winner to win any award other than the Oscar as their first award (his first award was a Tony). At age 87 when he won his Emmy, he was also the oldest winner, is the first LGBT winner, and the first non-American.
 Academy Awards:
 1981: Best Actor in a Supporting Role – Arthur
 Primetime Emmy Awards:
 1991: Outstanding Lead Actor in a Miniseries or Special – Summer's Lease
 Grammy Awards:
 1979: Best Spoken Word, Documentary or Drama Recording – Ages of Man
 Tony Awards:
 1948: Outstanding Foreign Company – The Importance of Being Earnest
 1961: Best Director of a Drama – Big Fish, Little Fish
 Special Awards:
 1959: Special Tony Award "for contribution to theatre for his extraordinary insight into the writings of Shakespeare as demonstrated in his one-man play Ages of Man"

Audrey Hepburn

British actress and humanitarian Audrey Hepburn (1929–1993) received her fourth distinct award posthumously in 1994. Between 1954 and 1994, Hepburn received a total of 4 competitive awards. She was the fifth person to complete the feat and the first to do so posthumously. She was also the first winner to win two of their awards in consecutive awards shows (the 1994 Grammys were the first Grammys since her posthumous win at the 1993 Emmys). She is one of the only two EGOT winners (the other being Jonathan Tunick) to not win multiple awards in any of the four award fields.
 Academy Awards:
 1954: Best Actress in a Leading Role – Roman Holiday
 Primetime Emmy Awards:
 1993: Outstanding Individual Achievement, Informational Programming – Gardens of the World with Audrey Hepburn
 Grammy Awards:
 1994: Best Spoken Word Album for Children – Audrey Hepburn's Enchanted Tales
 Tony Awards:
 1954: Distinguished Dramatic Actress – Ondine
 Special Awards:
 1968: Special Tony Award
 1993: Jean Hersholt Humanitarian Award

Marvin Hamlisch

American composer and conductor Marvin Hamlisch (1944–2012) received his fourth distinct award in 1995. Between 1974 and 2001, Hamlisch received a total of 12 awards. Before Alan Menken joined the group in 2020, Hamlisch had the most Oscars of any Grand Slam winners (three - all won in the same year). In 1974 he became the first winner to have won a "General Field" Grammy – taking Song of the Year and Best New Artist. He was also the first Grand Slam winner to have won multiple legs of the feat for the same work – an Oscar and a Grammy for the song "The Way We Were".
 Academy Awards:
 1974: Best Original Dramatic Score – The Way We Were
 1974: Best Original Song – "The Way We Were"
 1974: Best Scoring: Original Song Score and Adaptation or Scoring: Adaptation – The Sting
 Primetime Emmy Awards:
 1995: Outstanding Individual Achievement in Music Direction – Barbra: The Concert
 1995: Outstanding Individual Achievement in Music and Lyrics – Barbra: The Concert
 1999: Outstanding Music and Lyrics – AFI's 100 Years... 100 Movies
 2001: Outstanding Music Direction – Timeless: Live in Concert
 Grammy Awards:
 1974: Song of the Year – The Way We Were
 1974: Best New Artist
 1974: Best Pop Instrumental Performance – "The Entertainer"
 1974: Album of Best Original Score Written for a Motion Picture or a Television Special – The Way We Were
 Tony Awards:
 1976: Best Musical Score – A Chorus Line

Jonathan Tunick
American orchestrator, musical director, and composer Jonathan Tunick (born 1938) received his fourth distinct award in 1997. Between 1977 and 1997, Tunick received a total of four awards. Tunick is the first Grand Slam winner to have won an Emmy as their second award as well as the first to win the Tony as their fourth award. He is also the second person (after Audrey Hepburn) to not win multiple awards in any of the four award fields.
 Academy Awards:
 1977: Best Original Song Score and Its Adaptation or Adaptation Score – A Little Night Music
 Primetime Emmy Awards:
 1982: Outstanding Achievement in Music Direction – Night of 100 Stars
 Grammy Awards:
 1988: Best Instrumental Arrangement Accompanying Vocals – "No One is Alone" 
 Tony Awards:
 1997: Best Orchestrations – Titanic

Mel Brooks

American actor, comedian, and filmmaker Mel Brooks (born 1926) received his fourth distinct award in June 2001. Between 1968 and 2002, Brooks received a total of 11 awards. Brooks was the first person to win the Emmy as the first award, and the first winner to have won his Oscar for screenwriting.
 Academy Awards:
 1969: Best Story and Screenplay – Written Directly for the Screen – The Producers
 Primetime Emmy Awards:
 1967: Outstanding Writing Achievement in Variety – The Sid Caesar, Imogene Coca, Carl Reiner, Howard Morris Special
 1997: Outstanding Guest Actor in a Comedy Series – Mad About You
 1998: Outstanding Guest Actor in a Comedy Series – Mad About You
 1999: Outstanding Guest Actor in a Comedy Series – Mad About You
 Grammy Awards:
 1998: Best Spoken Comedy Album – The 2000 Year Old Man in the Year 2000
 2002: Best Long Form Music Video – Recording 'The Producers': A Musical Romp with Mel Brooks
 2002: Best Musical Show Album – The Producers
 Tony Awards:
 2001: Best Musical – The Producers
 2001: Best Book of a Musical – The Producers
 2001: Best Original Score – The Producers

When he appeared on the January 30, 2015 episode of Real Time with Bill Maher, Brooks called himself an EGOTAK, noting that he had also received awards from the American Film Institute and Kennedy Center.

Mike Nichols

American film and theater director, producer, actor, and comedian Mike Nichols (1931–2014) received his fourth distinct award in November 2001. Between 1961 and 2012, Nichols received a total of 15 awards. Nichols was the first slam winner to win the Grammy as their first award, the first winner to have won multiple awards (an Oscar, several Tonys, and two Emmys) for directing. When counting all awards won—not just the first of each type—Nichols has the longest timespan of awards among Grand Slam winners, at 51 years.
 Academy Awards:
 1968: Best Director – The Graduate
 Primetime Emmy Awards:
 2001: Outstanding Directing for a Miniseries, Movie or a Special – Wit
 2001: Outstanding Made for Television Movie – Wit
 2004: Outstanding Directing for a Miniseries, Movie or a Special – Angels in America
 2004: Outstanding Miniseries – Angels in America
 Grammy Awards:
 1961: Best Comedy Performance – An Evening with Mike Nichols and Elaine May
 Tony Awards:
 1964: Best Direction of a Play – Barefoot in the Park
 1965: Best Direction of a Play – Luv and The Odd Couple
 1968: Best Direction of a Play – Plaza Suite
 1972: Best Direction of a Play – The Prisoner of Second Avenue
 1977: Best Musical – Annie
 1984: Best Direction of a Play – The Real Thing
 1984: Best Play – The Real Thing
 2005: Best Direction of a Musical – Monty Python's Spamalot
 2012: Best Direction of a Play – Death of a Salesman

Whoopi Goldberg

American actor, comedian, author, and television personality Whoopi Goldberg (born 1955) received her fourth distinct award in 2002. Between 1985 and 2009, Goldberg received a total of 5 competitive awards. Goldberg is the first African American winner, the first to win the Oscar as their second award, and the first to win two of their different awards in the same year (she won both her first Daytime Emmy and her Tony in 2002).
 Academy Awards:
 1991: Best Supporting Actress – Ghost
 Daytime Emmy Awards:
 2002: Outstanding Special Class Special – Beyond Tara: The Extraordinary Life of Hattie McDaniel
 2009: Outstanding Talk Show Host – The View
 Grammy Awards:
 1986: Best Comedy Album – Whoopi Goldberg (Original Broadway Show Recording)
 Tony Awards:
 2002: Best Musical – Thoroughly Modern Millie
 Special Awards:
 1997: Special Emmy Award, Governors Award, for the seven Comic Relief Benefit Specials

Scott Rudin
American film, television, and theatre producer Scott Rudin (born 1958) received his fourth distinct award in 2012. Between 1984 and 2021, Rudin received a total of 21 awards making him, together with Alan Menken, the person with the most awards won among the people who have won all four awards in competitive categories. Rudin is the first winner who is primarily a producer.
 Academy Awards:
 2008: Best Picture – No Country for Old Men
 Primetime Emmy Awards:
 1984: Outstanding Children's Program – He Makes Me Feel Like Dancin'
 Grammy Awards:
 2012: Best Musical Theater Album – The Book of Mormon: Original Broadway Cast Recording
 Tony Awards:
 1994: Best Musical – Passion
 2000: Best Play – Copenhagen
 2002: Best Play – The Goat, or Who Is Sylvia?
 2005: Best Play – Doubt
 2006: Best Play – The History Boys
 2009: Best Play – God of Carnage
 2010: Best Revival of a Play – Fences
 2011: Best Musical – The Book of Mormon
 2012: Best Revival of a Play – Death of a Salesman
 2014: Best Revival of a Play – A Raisin in the Sun
 2015: Best Play – The Curious Incident of the Dog in the Night-Time
 2015: Best Revival of a Play – Skylight
 2016: Best Play – The Humans
 2016: Best Revival of a Play – A View From the Bridge
 2017: Best Revival of a Musical – Hello, Dolly!
 2019: Best Play – The Ferryman
 2019: Best Revival of a Play – The Boys in the Band
 2021: Best Play – The Inheritance

Robert Lopez

American songwriter Robert Lopez (born 1975) received his fourth distinct award in 2014. Between 2004 and 2021, Lopez received a total of 11 awards. Lopez is the first Filipino and Asian to achieve this feat. He is also the youngest winner to receive all four awards in competitive categories, as well as the fastest to complete his qualifying run of EGOT award wins (9 years). Lopez is the first (and to date only) person to win each EGOT award twice, a "double EGOT".

His initial Emmy prizes were Daytime Emmys, eventually winning a Primetime Emmy in 2021 for WandaVision. He is the second EGOT recipient (after John Legend) to follow a Daytime Emmy win with a subsequent Primetime Emmy. 

He received his Grammy Award for The Book of Mormon in collaboration with fellow EGOT winner Scott Rudin (among others), making them the first pair of Grand Slam winners to co-win the same award. Lopez is also the first person to have won the Oscar last, a prize shared with his wife Kristen Anderson-Lopez.

 Academy Awards:
 2014: Best Original Song – "Let It Go" from Frozen
 2018: Best Original Song – "Remember Me" from Coco
 Primetime Emmy Awards:
 2021: Outstanding Original Music and Lyrics – "Agatha All Along" from WandaVision
 Daytime Emmy Awards:
 2008: Outstanding Music Direction and Composition – Wonder Pets!
 2010: Outstanding Music Direction and Composition – Wonder Pets!
 Children's and Family Emmy Awards:
 2022: Outstanding Short Form Program – We the People
 Grammy Awards:
 2012: Best Musical Theater Album – The Book of Mormon: Original Broadway Cast Recording
 2015: Best Compilation Soundtrack for Visual Media – Frozen
 2015: Best Song Written for Visual Media – "Let It Go" from Frozen
 Tony Awards:
 2004: Best Original Score – Avenue Q
 2011: Best Book of a Musical – The Book of Mormon
 2011: Best Original Score – The Book of Mormon

Andrew Lloyd Webber

English composer and impresario of musical theatre Andrew Lloyd Webber (born 1948) received his fourth distinct award in 2018. Between 1980 and 2018, Lloyd Webber received a total of 11 competitive awards.
 Academy Awards:
 1997: Best Original Song – "You Must Love Me" from Evita
 Primetime Emmy Awards:
 2018: Outstanding Variety Special (Live) – Jesus Christ Superstar Live in Concert
 Grammy Awards:
 1980: Best Cast Show Album – Evita
 1983: Best Cast Show Album – Cats
 1986: Best Contemporary Composition – Requiem
 Tony Awards:
 1980: Best Original Score – Evita
 1983: Best Musical – Cats
 1983: Best Original Score – Cats
 1988: Best Musical – The Phantom of the Opera
 1995: Best Musical – Sunset Boulevard
 1995: Best Original Score – Sunset Boulevard
 Special Awards:
 1990: Grammy Legend Award
 2018: Special Tony Award

Tim Rice

English lyricist and author Tim Rice (born 1944) received his fourth distinct award in 2018. Between 1980 and 2018, Rice received a total of 12 awards, and shares some of his awards with his regular collaborator Andrew Lloyd Webber.
 Academy Awards:
 1993: Best Original Song – "A Whole New World" from Aladdin
 1995: Best Original Song – "Can You Feel the Love Tonight" from The Lion King
 1997: Best Original Song – "You Must Love Me" from Evita
 Primetime Emmy Awards:
 2018: Outstanding Variety Special (Live) – Jesus Christ Superstar Live in Concert
 Grammy Awards:
 1980: Best Cast Show Album – Evita
 1993: Song of the Year – "A Whole New World (Aladdin's Theme)"
 1993: Best Musical Album for Children – Aladdin - Original Motion Picture Soundtrack
 1993: Best Song Written Specifically for a Motion Picture or Television – "A Whole New World (Aladdin's Theme)"
 2000: Best Musical Show Album – Aida
 Tony Awards:
 1980: Best Original Score – Evita
 1980: Best Book of a Musical – Evita
 2000: Best Original Score – Aida

John Legend

American singer, songwriter, pianist, and record producer John Legend (born 1978) received his fourth distinct award in 2018. Between 2006 and 2022, Legend received a total of 18 awards. Legend has won the most Grammy Awards, 12, of any EGOT recipient, and is the first recipient who is primarily a musical performer. In addition to being the first black man to achieve EGOT status, Legend is the first person to receive the four awards in four consecutive years. He was also the first EGOT recipient to have won both a competitive Primetime and Daytime Emmy Award, an accomplishment matched by Robert Lopez in 2021. Legend, Andrew Lloyd Webber, and Tim Rice all simultaneously became EGOT recipients on September 9, 2018, when they were collectively awarded the Primetime Emmy Award for Outstanding Variety Special (Live) for Jesus Christ Superstar Live in Concert.
 Academy Awards:
 2015: Best Original Song – "Glory" from Selma
 Primetime Emmy Awards:
 2018: Outstanding Variety Special (Live) – Jesus Christ Superstar Live in Concert
 Daytime Emmy Awards:
 2019: Outstanding Interactive Media for a Daytime Program – Crow: The Legend
 2022: Outstanding Daytime Special – Shelter Me: Soul Awakened
 2022: Outstanding Short Form Daytime Program – Cornerstones: Founding Voices of the Black Church
 Grammy Awards:
 2006: Best New Artist
 2006: Best R&B Album – Get Lifted
 2006: Best Male R&B Vocal Performance – "Ordinary People"
 2007: Best Male R&B Vocal Performance – "Heaven"
 2007: Best R&B Performance by a Duo or Group with Vocals – "Family Affair"
 2009: Best R&B Performance by a Duo or Group with Vocals – "Stay with Me (By the Sea)"
 2011: Best R&B Song – "Shine"
 2011: Best Traditional R&B Vocal Performance – "Hang on in There"
 2011: Best R&B Album – Wake Up!
 2016: Best Song Written for Visual Media – "Glory"
 2020: Best Rap/Sung Performance – "Higher"
 2021: Best R&B Album – Bigger Love
 Tony Awards:
 2017: Best Revival of a Play – Jitney

Alan Menken

American composer Alan Menken (born 1949) received his fourth distinct award in 2020. Between 1990 and 2020, Menken received a total of 21 competitive awards. He has the most Oscar wins (8) by a grand slam winner and is the second most prolific Oscar winner in the music categories after Alfred Newman. He is also notable for frequently having multiple songs from the same film nominated for major awards.
 Academy Awards:
 1990: Best Original Score – The Little Mermaid
 1990: Best Original Song – "Under the Sea" from The Little Mermaid
 1992: Best Original Score – Beauty and the Beast
 1992: Best Original Song – "Beauty and the Beast" from Beauty and the Beast
 1993: Best Original Score – Aladdin
 1993: Best Original Song – "A Whole New World" from Aladdin
 1996: Best Original Musical or Comedy Score – Pocahontas
 1996: Best Original Song – "Colors of the Wind" from Pocahontas
 Daytime Emmy Awards:
 2020: Outstanding Original Song in a Children's, Young Adult or Animated Program – "Waiting in the Wings" from Rapunzel's Tangled Adventure
 Grammy Awards:
 1991: Best Recording for Children – The Little Mermaid: Original Walt Disney Records Soundtrack
 1991: Best Song Written Specifically for a Motion Picture or Television – "Under the Sea" from The Little Mermaid
 1993: Best Album for Children – Beauty and the Beast: Original Motion Picture Soundtrack
 1993: Best Instrumental Composition Written for a Motion Picture or for Television – Beauty and the Beast: Original Motion Picture Soundtrack
 1993: Best Song Written Specifically for a Motion Picture or Television – "Beauty and the Beast" from Beauty and the Beast
 1994: Song of the Year – "A Whole New World (Aladdin's Theme)" from Aladdin
 1994: Best Musical Album for Children – Aladdin: Original Motion Picture Soundtrack
 1994: Best Instrumental Composition Written for a Motion Picture or for Television – Aladdin: Original Motion Picture Soundtrack
 1994: Best Song Written Specifically for a Motion Picture or Television – "A Whole New World" from Aladdin
 1996: Best Song Written Specifically for a Motion Picture or Television – "Colors of the Wind" from Pocahontas
 2012: Best Song Written for Visual Media – "I See the Light" from Tangled
 Tony Awards:
 2012: Best Original Score – Newsies
 Special Awards:
 1990: Primetime Emmy Award for Outstanding Contribution to the success of the academy's anti-drug special for children – "Wonderful Ways to Say No" from the TV special Cartoon All-Stars to the Rescue

Jennifer Hudson

American singer, actress, and producer Jennifer Hudson (born 1981) received her fourth distinct award in 2022. Between 2007 and 2022, Hudson received a total of 5 competitive awards, making her currently the youngest female EGOT winner in history.
 Academy Awards:
 2007: Best Supporting Actress – Dreamgirls
 Daytime Emmy Awards:
 2021: Outstanding Interactive Media for a Daytime Program – Baba Yaga
 Grammy Awards:
 2009: Best R&B Album – Jennifer Hudson
 2017: Best Musical Theater Album – The Color Purple
 Tony Awards:
 2022: Best Musical – A Strange Loop

Viola Davis

American actress and producer Viola Davis (born 1965) received her fourth distinct award in 2023. Between 2001 and 2023, Davis received a total of five competitive awards. Davis acknowledged her new title upon accepting her Grammy.
 Academy Awards:
 2017: Best Supporting Actress – Fences
 Primetime Emmy Awards:
 2015: Outstanding Lead Actress in a Drama Series – How to Get Away with Murder
 Grammy Awards:
 2023: Best Audio Book, Narration & Storytelling Recording – Finding Me
 Tony Awards
 2001: Best Featured Actress in a Play – King Hedley II
 2010: Best Leading Actress in a Play – Fences

Non-competitive EGOT synopsis
Five additional artists have received all four awards, though one was bestowed for an honorary or similar non-competitive distinction: Barbra Streisand has no competitive Tony, Liza Minnelli has no competitive Grammy, and Harry Belafonte, James Earl Jones, and Quincy Jones have no competitive Oscar.

Barbra Streisand

American singer, actress, and director Barbra Streisand (born 1942) received her fourth distinct award in 1970. Between 1963 and 2001, Streisand received a total of 18 awards. Having completed the showbiz Grand Slam at age 28, she is the youngest winner, and with just six years elapsing between her first award (a 1964 Grammy) and her final award (a 1970 Special Tony), Streisand also completed the Grand Slam in the shortest amount of time. She is the only EGOT to win an Oscar in both a music and an acting category. Streisand is the only winner to have three competitive awards for debut performances: first studio album, first feature film, and first television special. Additional distinctions include the Peabody Award, the AFI Life Achievement Award, the Kennedy Center Honor, the Cecil B. DeMille Award, the National Medal of Arts, the American Society of Cinematographers Board of Governors Award, and the Presidential Medal of Freedom.
 Academy Awards:
 1969: Best Actress in a Leading Role – Funny Girl
 1977: Best Original Song – "Evergreen (Love Theme from A Star Is Born)"
 Primetime Emmy Awards:
 1965: Outstanding Individual Achievements in Entertainment – Actors and Performers – My Name is Barbra
 1995: Outstanding Individual Performance in a Variety or Music Program – Barbra Streisand: The Concert
 1995: Outstanding Variety, Music or Comedy Special – Barbra Streisand: The Concert
 2001: Outstanding Individual Performance in a Variety or Music Program – Timeless: Live in Concert
 Daytime Emmy Awards:
 2001: Outstanding Special Class Special – Reel Models: The First Women of Film
 Grammy Awards:
 1964: Best Vocal Performance, Female – The Barbra Streisand Album
 1964: Album of the Year (Other Than Classical) – The Barbra Streisand Album
 1965: Best Vocal Performance, Female – "People" (from the musical Funny Girl)
 1966: Best Vocal Performance, Female – My Name Is Barbra
 1978: Best Pop Vocal Performance, Female – "Evergreen (Love Theme from A Star Is Born)"
 1978: Song of the Year – "Evergreen (Love Theme from A Star Is Born)"
 1981: Best Pop Performance by a Duo or Group with Vocal – "Guilty" (with Barry Gibb)
 1987: Best Pop Vocal Performance, Female – The Broadway Album
 1992: Grammy Legend Award (non-competitive)
 1995: Grammy Lifetime Achievement Award (non-competitive)
 Tony Awards:
 1970: Special Tony Award: Star of the Decade (non-competitive)

Liza Minnelli

American actress, singer, dancer, and choreographer Liza Minnelli (born 1946) received her fourth distinct award in 1990. Between 1965 and 2009, Minnelli received a total of 7 awards.
 Academy Awards:
 1973: Best Actress in a Leading Role – Cabaret
 Primetime Emmy Awards:
 1973: Outstanding Single Program − Variety and Popular Music – Liza with a 'Z'. A Concert for Television
 Grammy Awards:
 1990: Grammy Legend Award (non-competitive)
 Tony Awards:
 1965: Best Leading Actress in a Musical – Flora the Red Menace
 1974: Special Tony Award for "adding lustre to the Broadway season" (non-competitive)
 1978: Best Leading Actress in a Musical – The Act
 2009: Best Special Theatrical Event – Liza's at The Palace...!

James Earl Jones

American actor James Earl Jones (born 1931) received his fourth distinct award in 2011. Between 1969 and 2011, Jones received a total of 7 awards.
 Academy Awards:
 2011: Academy Honorary Award (non-competitive)
 Primetime Emmy Awards:
 1991: Outstanding Lead Actor in a Drama Series – Gabriel's Fire
 1991: Outstanding Supporting Actor in a Miniseries or a Movie – Heat Wave
 Daytime Emmy Awards:
 2000: Outstanding Performer − Children's Special – Summer's End
 Grammy Awards:
 1977: Best Spoken Word Recording – Great American Documents
 Tony Awards:
 1969: Best Leading Actor in a Play – The Great White Hope
 1987: Best Leading Actor in a Play – Fences
 2017: Special Tony Award for Lifetime Achievement in the Theatre (non-competitive)

Harry Belafonte

American singer, activist, and actor Harry Belafonte (born 1927) received his fourth distinct award in 2014. Between 1954 and 2014, Belafonte received a total of 6 awards.
 Academy Awards:
 2014: Jean Hersholt Humanitarian Award (non-competitive)
 Primetime Emmy Awards:
 1960: Outstanding Individual Performance in a Variety or Music Program – Tonight with Belafonte - The Revlon Revue
 Grammy Awards:
 1961: Best Performance – Folk – Swing Dat Hammer
 1966: Best Folk Performance – An Evening with Belafonte/Makeba
 2000: Grammy Hall of Fame Award
 Tony Awards:
 1954: Best Featured Actor in a Musical – John Murray Anderson's Almanac

Quincy Jones

American record producer, musician, songwriter, composer, arranger, and film and television producer Quincy Jones (born 1933) received his fourth distinct award in 2016. Between 1964 and 2019, Jones received a total of 31 awards — the highest number of awards of any grand slam winner. He has 28 Grammy Awards and a Grammy Legend Award received in 1992.
 Academy Awards:
 1994: Jean Hersholt Humanitarian Award (non-competitive)
 Primetime Emmy Awards:
 1977: Outstanding Achievement in Music Composition for a Series (Dramatic Underscore) – Roots
 Grammy Awards:
 1964: Best Instrumental Arrangement – "I Can't Stop Loving You"
 1970: Best Instrumental Jazz Performance - Large Group Or Soloist With Large Group – Walking in Space
 1972: Best Pop Instrumental Performance – Smackwater Jack
 1974: Best Instrumental Arrangement – "Summer in the City"
 1979: Best Instrumental Arrangement – "The Wiz Main Title (Overture, Part One)"
 1981: Best Instrumental Arrangement – "Dinorah, Dinorah"
 1982: Producer of the Year
 1982: Best Instrumental Arrangement Accompanying Vocal(s) – "Ai No Corrida" (with Jerry Hey)
 1982: Best Arrangement on an Instrumental Recording – "Velas"
 1982: Best Cast Show Album – Lena Horne: The Lady and Her Music
 1982: Best R&B Performance by a Duo or Group with Vocal – "The Dude"
 1984: Producer of the Year (Non-Classical)
 1984: Best Recording For Children – E.T. the Extra-Terrestrial
 1984: Album of the Year – Thriller
 1984: Record of the Year – "Beat It"
 1985: Best Arrangement on an Instrumental – "Grace (Gymnastics Theme)" (with Jeremy Lubbock)
 1986: Best Music Video, Short Form – "We Are the World – The Video Event"
 1986: Best Pop Performance by a Duo or Group with Vocals – "We Are the World"
 1986: Record of the Year – "We Are the World"
 1991: Producer of the Year (Non-Classical)
 1991: Best Instrumental Arrangement Accompanying Vocal(s) – "The Places You Find Love"
 1991: Best Arrangement on an Instrumental – "Birdland"
 1991: Best Jazz Fusion Performance – "Birdland"
 1991: Best Rap Performance by a Duo or Group – "Back on the Block"
 1991: Album of the Year – Back on the Block
 1994: Best Large Jazz Ensemble Performance – Miles & Quincy Live at Montreux
 2002: Best Spoken Word Album – Q: The Autobiography of Quincy Jones
 2019: Best Music Film – Quincy
 Tony Awards:
 2016: Best Revival of a Musical – The Color Purple

Three competitive awards
The following people have each won three out of the four major entertainment awards in competitive categories.

Without an Emmy

 Henry Fonda†, ◊
 Oscar Hammerstein II†, PP
 Elton John
 Alan Jay Lerner†
 Frank Loesser†, PP
 Benj Pasek◊
 Justin Paul◊
 Stephen Sondheim†, PP
 Jule Styne†

Without a Grammy

 Jack Albertson†, TC
 Anne Bancroft†, TC
 Ingrid Bergman†, TC
 Shirley Booth†, TC
 Ralph Burns†, ◊
 Ellen Burstyn◊, TC
 Melvyn Douglas†, TC
 Bob Fosse†
 Jeremy Irons◊, TC
 Glenda JacksonTC
 Jessica LangeTC
 Frances McDormandTC
 Liza Minnelli◊, NCA
 Helen MirrenTC
 Thomas Mitchell†, TC
 Al Pacino◊, TC
 Christopher Plummer†, ◊, TC
 Vanessa Redgrave◊, TC
 Jason Robards†, ◊, TC
 Geoffrey RushTC
 Paul Scofield†, ◊, TC
 Maggie SmithTC
 Maureen Stapleton†, ◊, TC
 Jessica Tandy†, TC
 Tony Walton†

Without an Oscar

 Harry BelafonteNCA
 Leonard Bernstein†, ◊
 Jerry Bock†, PP
 Martin Charnin†, PA
 Cy Coleman†, ◊
 André De Shields
 Fred Ebb†, ◊
 Cynthia Erivo◊
 Anne GarefinoPA
 George Grizzard†
 Julie Harris†, ◊
 Hugh Jackman◊
 James Earl Jones◊, NCA
 Quincy Jones◊, NCA
 Rachel Bay Jones
 John Kander◊
 Tom KittPP
 Alex Lacamoire
 Stan LathanPA
 Cyndi Lauper
 Katrina Lenk
 Audra McDonald
 Bette Midler◊
 Lin-Manuel Miranda◊, PP
 Cynthia Nixon
Trey Parker◊, PA
 Ben Platt
 Billy Porter
 Marc Shaiman◊
 Bill Sherman
 Ari'el Stachel
 Matt StonePA
 Charles StrousePA
 Lily Tomlin◊, PA
 Dick Van Dyke
 James Whitmore†, ◊
 David Yazbek

Without a Tony

 John Addison†
 Adele
 Kristen Anderson-Lopez◊
 Julie Andrews◊
 Burt Bacharach†, ◊
 Alan Bergman
 Marilyn Bergman†
 Jon Blair
 George Burns†
 Cher
 Common
 Eminem
 Rob EpsteinPA
 James Gay-Rees
 Michael Giacchino
 Alex Gibney
 Alex Gibson
 Ludwig Göransson
 Brian Grazer◊
 Hildur Guðnadóttir
 H.E.R.
 Ron Howard
 Paul McCartney
 James MollPA
 Shawn Murphy
 Morgan Neville
 Randy Newman
 Sid Ramin†
 Trent Reznor
 Caitrin Rogers
 Atticus Ross
 Martin Scorsese
 Ringo Starr
 Barbra Streisand◊, PA, NCA
 Peter Ustinov†, ◊
 John Williams
 Robin Williams†
 Kate Winslet

Notes
 † – Person is deceased.
 ◊ – Person has been nominated at least once for a competitive category of the missing award but has failed to win.
NCA – Person won a non-competitive award in this category (see section above).
PA – Person has won the Peabody Award
PP – Person has won the Pulitzer Prize
TC – Person has joined EGOT winners Helen Hayes, Rita Moreno, and Viola Davis as winners of the Triple Crown of Acting, with singular (non-group/ensemble/company) acting wins in each of the Emmy, Oscar and Tony awards.

Three non-competitive awards
In addition to the above winners, the following people have each won three out of the four major entertainment awards in either competitive categories or non-competitive special and honorary categories.

 Howard Ashman†, ◊ won two competitive Oscars, five competitive Grammy Awards, and a Special Emmy Award.
 Fred Astaire† won three competitive Emmy Awards, a Special Academy Award, and a Grammy Lifetime Achievement Award.
 Robert Russell Bennett† won a competitive Emmy Award, a competitive Oscar, and two Special Tony Awards.
 Irving Berlin† won an Academy Award, a Grammy Lifetime Achievement Award, and a competitive Tony award.
 Carol Burnett won six competitive Emmy Awards, one competitive Grammy award, and a Special Tony Award.
 David Byrne won an Academy Award, a competitive Grammy Award, and a Special Tony Award.
 Walt Disney† won 26 competitive Academy Awards, seven competitive Emmy Awards, and a Grammy Trustees Award.
 Ray Dolby† won an Academy Scientific and Technical Award, two Technology & Engineering Emmy Awards, and a Special Merit/Technical Grammy Award.
 Michael J. Fox won five competitive Emmy Awards, a competitive Grammy Award, and the Jean Hersholt Humanitarian Award, a non-competitive Academy Award. 
 Judy Garland†, ◊ won an Academy Juvenile Award, two competitive Grammy Awards, and a Special Tony Award.
 Eileen Heckart† won a competitive Academy Award, a competitive Emmy Award, and a Special Tony Award.
 Danny Kaye† won a competitive Emmy Award, a Special Tony Award, and the Jean Hersholt Humanitarian Award, a non-competitive Academy Award.
 Barry Manilow won two competitive Emmy Awards, a competitive Grammy Award, and a Special Tony Award.
 Frank Marshall◊ won a competitive Grammy Award, a competitive Tony Award, and the Irving G. Thalberg Memorial Award, a non-competitive Academy Award.
 Steve Martin◊ won the Honorary Academy Award, a competitive Emmy Award, and five competitive Grammy Awards.
 Elaine May won the Honorary Academy Award, a competitive Tony Award, and a competitive Grammy Award.
 Laurence Olivier†, ◊ won two competitive Oscars, five competitive Emmy Awards, and a Special Tony Award.
 Stephen Schwartz won three competitive Oscars, three competitive Grammys and the Isabelle Stevenson Award, a non-competitive Tony Award.
 Bruce Springsteen◊ won 20 competitive Grammys, a competitive Academy Award, and a Special Tony Award.
 Thomas Stockham† won an Academy Scientific and Technical Award, a Technology & Engineering Emmy Award, and a Technical Grammy Award.
 Cicely Tyson† won three competitive Emmy Awards, a competitive Tony Award, and an Academy Honorary Award.
 Eli Wallach† won a competitive Tony Award, a competitive Emmy Award, and an Academy Honorary Award.
 Diane Warren won a competitive Grammy Award, a competitive Emmy Award, and an Academy Honorary Award.
 Oprah Winfrey won competitive Emmy Awards, a competitive Tony Award, and the Jean Hersholt Humanitarian Award, a non-competitive Academy Award.

Notes
 † – Person is deceased.
 ◊ – Person has been nominated at least once for a competitive category of the missing award but has failed to win.

Four nominations
The following people have not won all four awards in competitive categories but have received at least one nomination for each of them:

 Lynn Ahrens
 Alan Alda
 Joan Allen
 Woody Allen
 Judith Anderson†
 Kristen Anderson-Lopez
 Julie Andrews
 Alan Arkin
 Howard Ashman†
 Burt Bacharach†
 Lauren Bacall†
 Ed Begley†
 Elmer Bernstein†
 Leonard Bernstein†
 Ralph Burns†
 Ellen Burstyn
 Richard Burton†
 Sammy Cahn†
 Keith Carradine
 Diahann Carroll†
 Stockard Channing
 Don Cheadle
 Glenn Close
 Cy Coleman†
 Fred Ebb†
 Cynthia Erivo
 José Ferrer†
 Henry Fonda†
 Morgan Freeman
 Judy Garland†
 Jack Gilford†
 Elliot Goldenthal
 Brian Grazer
 Joel Grey
 Julie Harris†
 Katharine Hepburn†
 Jeremy Irons
 Hugh Jackman
 James Earl Jones
 Quincy Jones
 John Kander
 Tony Kushner
 Angela Lansbury†
 Michel Legrand†
 Jack Lemmon†
 John Lithgow
 Kenny Loggins
 Frank Marshall
 Steve Martin
 Bette Midler
 Liza Minnelli
 Lin-Manuel Miranda
 Paul Newman†
 Laurence Olivier†
 Leslie Odom Jr.
 Al Pacino
 Trey Parker
 Dolly Parton
 Benj Pasek
 Justin Paul
 Christopher Plummer†
 Sidney Poitier†
 André Previn†
 Lynn Redgrave†
 Vanessa Redgrave
 Jason Robards†
 Mark Ruffalo
 Adam Schlesinger†
 Paul Scofield†
 Marc Shaiman
 David Shire
 Paul Simon
 Glenn Slater
 Will Smith
 Tom Snow
 Kevin Spacey
 Bruce Springsteen
 Sting
 Maureen Stapleton†
 Barbra Streisand
 Meryl Streep
 Lily Tomlin
 Stanley Tucci
 Peter Ustinov†
 Jimmy Van Heusen†
 Denzel Washington
 Sigourney Weaver
 James Whitmore†
 Scott Wittman
 Hans Zimmer

Notes
 † – Person is deceased.

Variations

PEGOT 
There are conflicting definitions for the PEGOT. Some say the "P" refers to the Peabody Award, others say it is the Pulitzer Prize. , Mike Nichols, Rita Moreno and Barbra Streisand (if her Special Tony Award is considered) have achieved this status by winning the Peabody; while Richard Rodgers and Marvin Hamlisch have achieved it by winning the Pulitzer.

EGOT winners who have also won a Peabody Award:
 Barbra Streisand
 Mike Nichols
 Rita Moreno

EGOT winners who have also won a Pulitzer Prize:
 Richard Rodgers
 Marvin Hamlisch

People who have won a Peabody, and lack only one EGOT award:
 Carol Burnett (missing an Oscar)
 Martin Charnin (missing an Oscar)
 Rob Epstein (missing a Tony)
 Anne Garefino (missing an Oscar)
 James Moll (missing a Tony)
 Trey Parker (missing an Oscar)
 Matt Stone (missing an Oscar)
 Charles Strouse (missing an Oscar)
 Lily Tomlin (missing an Oscar)
 Cicely Tyson (missing a Grammy)
 Oprah Winfrey (missing a Grammy)

Parker and Tomlin were nominated for a 1999 Oscar for Best Original Song and 1975 Oscar for Best Supporting Actress, respectively, but did not win.

People who have won a Pulitzer, and lack only one EGOT award:
 Jerry Bock (missing an Oscar)
 Oscar Hammerstein II (missing an Emmy)
 Tom Kitt (missing an Oscar)
 Frank Loesser (missing an Emmy)
 Lin-Manuel Miranda (missing an Oscar)
 Stephen Sondheim (missing an Emmy)

Miranda was nominated for the Oscar for Best Original Song in both 2017 and 2022 but did not win either.

Notes

REGOT 
Another variation is the REGOT, which includes being awarded a Razzie. Alan Menken has a REGOT due to his Razzie win with Jack Feldman for Worst Original Song for "High Times, Hard Times" from Newsies. With her Razzie win for Worst Actress for Rent-a-Cop and Arthur 2: On the Rocks, Liza Minnelli has a REGOT if her non-competitive Grammy Legend Award is considered.

Equivalent honours outside the United States
The Emmy, Grammy, Oscar and Tony Awards are presided over by industry bodies based in the United States, and as of 2023, 14 out of the 18 EGOT winners were American nationals. The remaining four ― John Gielgud, Audrey Hepburn, Andrew Lloyd Webber, and Tim Rice ― were British. Many countries hold their own equivalent awards ceremonies honouring their own television, music, film, and theatre industries. In some cases, commentators in other countries have derived their own acronyms for individuals who have won at all four ceremonies.

Canada
In 2018, Leah Collins of CBC Arts proposed a Canadian equivalent of the EGOT: the Canadian Screen Awards (and their predecessors, the Gemini and Genie Awards) for film and television, the Juno Awards for music, and the Dora Mavor Moore Awards for theatre. Toronto-based game show Trivia Club referred to this combination as the "Two-Can-Ju-Do". No individual has won in all four categories.

Australia
In 2019, Caitlin Welsh of Nova Entertainment proposed the "LAHA" as an Australian equivalent: the Logie Awards for television, the ARIA Music Awards for music, the Helpmann Awards for theatre, and the AACTA Awards for film. She also could not identify any winners of all four awards, although Noni Hazlehurst has received nominations in all four.

See also
 Triple Crown of Acting

References

External links
Entertainment Weekly: 18 stars who are EGOT winners

 
People who have won Academy, Emmy, Grammy, and Tony Awards
 
 
 
Academy, Emmy, Grammy, and Tony Awards
Academy, Emmy, Grammy, and Tony Awards
1984 introductions